The Mesabi Trail is a 132 mile paved bicycle trail running from Grand Rapids, Minnesota to Ely, Minnesota.  As of 2022, two sections remain to be completed: McKinley to Biwabik, and the seven miles south of Tower.  Trail construction is expected to be finished by 2024. The trail goes through the many small towns along it, such as Marble, Keewatin, Hibbing, Mountain Iron, Virginia, and Gilbert.  Much of the trail runs along abandoned railroad grade.

The Great River Mesabi Trail Ride 
Since 2005, the Mesabi Trail has hosted a long bike ride every year in mid-August. Each stop (usually at a town or at intervals between towns) has fruit, water, granola, and other snacks. In Buhl, there is ice cream. The refreshments are free, as is the food at the ending destination, but there is a fee to ride in this event.  To accommodate riders of different abilities, the ride includes multiple official starting points; while the full route may be 50 to 70 miles, intermediate starting places along the route may be as close as 8 or 10 miles from the end.

Historical signs 
Along the Mesabi Trail there are signs that establish the history along it. Most of the signs notice certain areas as important to the Mesabi Range's early mining economy.

References

External links
Mesabi Trail Website

Bike paths in Minnesota
Protected areas of Itasca County, Minnesota
Protected areas of St. Louis County, Minnesota
Rail trails in Minnesota